The Assyrian Eponym Chronicles represent an important source for the chronology of the Ancient Near East. They are chronicles or annals, which list at least one notable event per year under the name of a ruling official. 

The oldest eponym chronicle is the one compiled at Mari in the 18th century BC, covering the years before and during the reign of Shamshi-Adad I.
It is extant in eleven fragments excavated at the Royal Palace of Mari and first edited by M. Birot in 1985.

Michel (2002) proposed the identification of a solar eclipse mentioned in the Mari Eponym Chronicle (in the year eponymous of  Puzur-Ishtar) as occurring on 24 June 1833 BC.
According to Werner Nahm (2014) this would date the beginning of the reign of Hammurabi to 1784 BC (close to the date of 1792 BC according to the Middle Chronology).

See also
Chronology of the ancient Near East

References

M Birot, "Les chroniques 'Assyriennes' de Mari", MARI 4 (1985), 219–242.
Rafal Kolinski, "The Mari Eponym Chronicle: Reconstruction of the Lay-Out of the Text and the Placement of Fragment C",  Anatolica 41 (2015),  61–86.
A. Millard, "The Eponyms of the Assyrian Empire 910-612 BC", Neo-Assyrian Text Corpus Project (1994)

18th-century BC literature
1985 archaeological discoveries
Archaeological discoveries in Mari, Syria
Middle Eastern chronicles
Chronology
Assyriology